Faur is a surname. Notable people with the surname include:

 José Faur, Sepharadi Hakham (rabbi), teacher and scholar
 Freda du Faur, the first female mountaineer to climb New Zealand's tallest mountain, Mount Cook
 Guy Du Faur, Seigneur de Pibrac, French jurist and poet

Occitan-language surnames
Romanian-language surnames